"Louder than Words" is a song by English rock band Pink Floyd, written by David Gilmour and Polly Samson. The song, featuring lyrics written by Samson to accompany a composition by Gilmour, was recorded by the band as the closing track of their fifteenth studio and final album, The Endless River. The track features a posthumous appearance by former keyboardist and founder member of Pink Floyd, Richard Wright, and an appearance by electronic string quartet Escala. "Louder than Words" is the only song on the album with lyrics, which were sung by Gilmour.

The track was released to US mainstream rock radio on 14 October 2014, serving as the first and only release in promotion of The Endless River.

Composition
The music accompanying the song, composed by David Gilmour, has been described by various music critics and writers, including Exclaim! writer Josiah Hughes as "a slow-burning, melodramatic track complete with plenty of intense guitar and synth work" and by Clash writer Robin Murray as a "sparse, trippy track, one which is heavy on guitar led atmosphere and ominous electronic production". The lyrics, written by Gilmour's wife, Polly Samson, provide "stately depiction of undying love, a tribute to Richard Wright and the importance of overcoming petty differences". Gilmour spoke about the song with The Guardian, stating:

Gilmour and Mason eventually reversed that decision in 2022, releasing the single "Hey, Hey, Rise Up!", in aid of humanitarian relief during the Russian invasion of Ukraine.

Lyrics
David Gilmour's wife Polly Samson wrote the lyrics for "Louder than Words."  She based the lyrics on observations of the band's behaviour during the rehearsals, downtime and performance at Live 8 in July 2005, the band's first reunion as Pink Floyd with Roger Waters in over 24 years.

Music video
The majority of the music video for "Louder than Words" was shot in Kazakhstan on what was once the Aral Sea. Director Po Powell said to Rolling Stone that the arid landscape that once held one of the world's four largest inland lakes was now "A surreal image if ever I saw one ... a shocking example of human mismanagement and one of the planet's worst environmental disasters. ... The river has shrunk to 10 percent of its original size, destroying the fishing industry and whole townships." As the disaster is somewhat well-known, Powell tried to focus on what it means to a younger generation that was now growing up without the fishing and maritime influences of their forefathers. In contrast, the opening of the music video features a man paddling through clouds (evoking the album cover) and footage of Gilmour, Wright, and Pink Floyd drummer Nick Mason during the Division Bell sessions, with contemporary footage of Gilmour singing at his Medina studio.

Reception
"Louder than Words" received generally positive reviews from music critics. Tom Breihan of Spin Media music webzine Stereogum wrote positively of the song, stating that "the song is a lovely piece of work, a slow prog-rock elegy with a gospel choir and some classic Floyd guitar". Brad Bershad of Zumic also gave the song a positive review. "Gilmour's guitar parts are stellar, although perhaps softer than the classic jagged tone of the '70s records.", he said. "Time has softened The Floyd a bit, but this is still a beautiful song. The autobiographical lyrics, referring to the power behind Pink Floyd's music and infighting are excellent." The song reached number 1 on Polish Radio 3 Chart on 24 October.

Personnel
Adapted from The Endless River liner notes.

Pink Floyd
David Gilmour – guitars, vocals, Hammond organ, effects, production
Nick Mason – drums, percussion
Richard Wright – Rhodes piano, piano, synthesiser

Escala
Chantal Leverton – viola
Victoria Lyon – violin
Helen Nash – cello
Honor Watson – violin

Additional musicians
Bob Ezrin – bass guitar, producer (original 1993 sessions) 
Durga McBroom – backing vocals
Louise Marshal – backing vocals
Sarah Brown – backing vocals

Production
Phil Manzanera – producer
Martin Glover – producer
Andy Jackson – engineer, producer
Damon Iddins – engineer

Charts

Release history

References

External links
Official music video

2014 songs
Pink Floyd songs
British songs
2010s ballads
Rock ballads
Songs written by David Gilmour
Songs with lyrics by Polly Samson
Songs released posthumously
2014 singles
Parlophone singles
Song recordings produced by David Gilmour
Songs about music